Belfast North may refer to:

Belfast North (Assembly constituency), a constituency in the Northern Ireland Assembly
Belfast North (Northern Ireland Parliament constituency), a borough constituency of the Parliament of Northern Ireland from 1921 to 1929
Belfast North (UK Parliament constituency), a constituency in the United Kingdom House of Commons

See also
Belfast, capital and largest city of Northern Ireland
Belfast Northstars, a baseball club from Northern Ireland